Captain Eurípides Rubio (March 1, 1938 – November 8, 1966) was a United States Army officer and one of nine Puerto Ricans who were posthumously awarded the United States' highest military decoration for valor, the Medal of Honor, for actions on November 8, 1966, during the Vietnam War. Rubio was a member of the United States Army, Headquarters & Headquarters Company, 1st Battalion, 28th Infantry Regiment (Black Lions), 1st Infantry Division, Republic of Vietnam.

Early years
Rubio was born in the city of Ponce, Puerto Rico, in the southern region of Puerto Rico. There, he received his primary and secondary education. Rubio was a member of the 
Civil Air Patrol's Ponce High School Cadet Squadron, Chapter 52012/PR012, Puerto Rico Wing, from 1952 to 1956. In 1956, Rubio joined the Army at Fort Buchanan, Puerto Rico.

Action in Vietnam
On November 8, 1966, during Operation Attleboro in Tay Ninh Province, South Vietnam, Captain Rubio's company came under attack from the North Vietnamese Army; leaving the safety of his post, Rubio received two serious wounds as he braved the intense enemy fire to distribute ammunition, re-establish positions and render aid to the wounded. Despite his pain, he assumed command when a rifle company commander was medically evacuated. He was then wounded a third time as he tried to move amongst his men to encourage them to fight with renewed effort.

While aiding the evacuation of wounded personnel, he noted that a US smoke grenade, which was intended to mark the Viet Cong's position for an air strike, had fallen dangerously close to friendly lines. He ran to move the grenade but was immediately struck to his knees by enemy fire. Despite his wounds, Rubio managed to collect the grenade and again run through enemy fire to within 20 m of the enemy position to throw the by-then already smoking grenade into the enemy before he fell for the final time. Using the now-repositioned grenade as a marker, friendly air strikes were directed to destroy the hostile positions.

Rubio's singularly heroic act turned the tide of the battle, and for his extraordinary leadership and valor, he posthumously received the Medal of Honor in 1968. His remains were buried in Puerto Rico National Cemetery in the city of Bayamón, Puerto Rico.

Medal of Honor citation

Military decorations awarded
Among the military decorations which Capt. Rubio earned were the following:

Foreign unit decorations
  Fourragère cord

Legacy
The United States Army Reserve Center located at the Hato Rey sector of San Juan was named posthumously named Capt. Eurípides Rubio United States Army Reserve Center.

The United States Department of Veterans Affairs Outpatient Clinic in Ponce was also named in memory of Captain Eurípides Rubio.

The American Legion Post 142 in San Juan was named after Capt. Euripides Rubio.

Rubio's name is inscribed in "El Monumento de la Recordación" (Monument of Remembrance), dedicated to Puerto Rico's fallen soldiers and situated in front of the Capitol Building in San Juan.

His name is inscribed on the Vietnam Veterans Memorial ("The Wall") on Panel 12E, Row 044.

On November 11, 2008, the Government of Puerto Rico unveiled in the Capitol Rotunda an oil portrait of Captain Euripedes Rubio.

See also

List of Puerto Ricans
List of Puerto Rican military personnel
Puerto Rican recipients of the Medal of Honor
List of Hispanic Medal of Honor recipients
List of Medal of Honor recipients
List of Medal of Honor recipients for the Vietnam War

References

Further reading
Puertorriquenos Who Served With Guts, Glory, and Honor. Fighting to Defend a Nation Not Completely Their Own; by : Greg Boudonck;

External links

1938 births
1966 deaths
Military personnel from Ponce
Puerto Rican Army personnel
United States Army officers
Puerto Rican recipients of the Medal of Honor
United States Army Medal of Honor recipients
United States Army personnel of the Vietnam War
American military personnel killed in the Vietnam War
People of the Civil Air Patrol
Puerto Rican military officers
Vietnam War recipients of the Medal of Honor